DWTI (972 AM) Kasamang TI is a radio station owned and operated by Katigbak Enterprises. The station's studio is located at Broadcast Village, Brgy. Ibabang Dupay, Lucena City.

References

DWTI
Radio stations established in 1964